Oberea ruficeps is a species of beetle in the family Cerambycidae. It was described by Fischer von Waldheim in 1842.

Subspecies
 Oberea ruficeps ruficeps Fischer von Waldheim, 1842
 Oberea ruficeps muchei Breuning, 1981

References

Beetles described in 1842
ruficeps